Víctor Manuel Zapata Caicedo (born 29 September 1994) is an English former footballer who played as a attacker.

Career

Club career

As a youth player, Zapata joined the youth academy of English Premier League side Tottenham. In 2014, he signed for Banbury United in the English seventh tier. Before the second half of 2014–15, Zapata signed for Czech top flight club Baník, where he made 3 league appearances and scored 0 goals. On 24 April 2015, he debuted for Baník during a 0–2 loss to Vysočina.

Before the second half of 2015–16, Zapata signed for Welling United in the English fifth tier. In 2017, he  signed for Colombian second tier team Atlético FC. In 2019, he signed for KRC Gent in Belgium.

International career

References

External links
 

1994 births
Living people
Association football forwards
Banbury United F.C. players
Categoría Primera B players
Czech First League players
English expatriate footballers
English expatriate sportspeople in Belgium
English expatriate sportspeople in the Czech Republic
English footballers
English people of Colombian descent
Expatriate footballers in Belgium
Expatriate footballers in the Czech Republic
FC Baník Ostrava players
National League (English football) players
Southern Football League players
Welling United F.C. players